Lalla (Lella), Řalla or Řadja, is an Amazigh word and title meaning "Lady", "My lady", "Miss." or "Mrs.".

The honorific title Lalla is used all over the countries of North Africa, mainly Morocco, Tunisia, Algeria, Mauritania, and Libya, to politely address or mention any woman. In Morocco, if the respected or adult woman is known to the person, he or she would address her using the title Lalla before using her personal name or family name. In Mauritania, Lalla is often used on its own as a given name for women. It is sometimes also used with another noun to form a compound given name, such as in the names of Lalla-Aicha and Lalla-Meryem.

The title Lalla has always been in standard use by the many royal families of Morocco and Tunisia as a title for each and every princess and king's wife. It is also used as a fixed honorary title in combination with the woman's personal name as a sign of distinction given to women from royal or noble families among the people of North Africa. In many place names and mausoleums in North Africa, the title Lalla can also be understood as "female saint".

In the everyday Berber language, the word Lalla can also mean in some regions "older sister", "older female cousin", "aunt", "mother-in-law", etc. The word has dialectal varieties such as Řalla and Řadja, but the form Lalla is the most common. The word Lalla is derived from the Berber language noun Alallu which means "dignity", and from the Berber verb "lullet" meaning "to be free" or "to be noble". The Berber word "tilelli", which means freedom, is related to the same semantic field.

Smiyet (or Smiyit) Lalla is a title of respect used for a daughter bearing the same name as her mother or grandmother.

The masculine versions of the title Lalla in Morocco are: Moulay, Sidi (of Arabic origin); and "Mass", "Dda", "Dadda" (of Berber origin). The two titles "Moulay" and "Sidi" are said to princes, chieftains, saints, or any respected men in society or family.

Notable Lalla

Celebrities and Princesses
 Lalla Fatma N'Soumer (1830–1863), heroine of the Kabyle resistance (Algeria) against the French colonial empire.
 Lalla Chella, wife of the Sultan of Merinid and Abbessine origin Abu al-Hasan and whose necropolis is located in Chellah, Morocco.
 Lalla Zoulikha Oudai, Algerian resistance fighter, intelligence operative, and martyr of the Algerian War of Independence.
 Lalla Traki (18..–1919), daughter of Muhammad IV of Tunisia and wife of Muhammad VII.
 Lalla Khedaoudj El Amia, daughter of Hassan El Khaznadji, treasurer of Dey Baba Mohammed ben-Osman (Dey of the regency of Algiers in the 18th century).

 Lalla Kmar (1862–1942), queen consort of Tunisia during three reigns, after having successively married Muhammad III Sadiq, Ali III and Muhammad V
 Lalla Jeneïna (1887–1960), last queen consort of Tunisia and wife of Muhammad VIII, last king of Tunisia.
 Lalla Aïcha (1906–1994), first daughter and eldest child of King Muhammad VIII of Tunisia.
 Lalla Abla (1909–1992), wife of King Mohammed V of Morocco and mother of King Hassan II of Morocco.
 Lalla Zakia (1921–1998), daughter of Muhammad VIII, last king of Tunisia.
 Lalla Lilia (1929–2021), daughter of Muhammad VIII, last king of Tunisia.
 Lalla Aïcha (1931–2011), sister of King Hassan II, and daughter of King Mohammed V of Morocco. 
 Lalla Malika (1933–2021), sister of King Hassan II, and daughter of King Mohammed V of Morocco.
 Lalla Latifa (1945–), widow of King Hassan II, and mother of King Mohammed VI of Morocco
 Lalla Nuzha (1940–1977), sister of King Hassan II, and daughter of King Mohammed V of Morocco.
 Lalla Amina (1954–2012), sister of King Hassan II, and daughter of King Mohammed V of Morocco.
 Lalla Meryem (1962–), first daughter and eldest child of King Hassan II of Morocco and sister of King Mohammed VI.
 Lalla Asma (1965–), daughter of King Hassan II of Morocco and sister of King Mohammed VI.
 Lalla Hasna (1967–), daughter of King Hassan II of Morocco and sister of King Mohammed VI.
 Lalla Salma (1978–), princess consort of Morocco and wife of King Mohammed VI of Morocco.
 Lalla Khadija (2007–), daughter of King Mohammed VI of Morocco.

Saints
 Lalla Khlidja, also called Yemma Khlidja, woman poetess and saint Kabyle woman of the tribe of Imchedalen.
 Lalla Maghnia, saint who gave her name to the city of Maghnia in Algeria.
 Lalla Mimouna, saint, celebrated by the Jews of the Maghreb known throughout the Maghreb, especially in Morocco and Algeria. The city of Lalla Mimouna located in the province of Kenitra in Morocco bears her name. Jewish families in Tlemcen, Algeria, celebrate Mimouna in tribute.
 Lalla Manoubia, Tunisian saint of great renown. A hagiographic account entitled Manâqib is dedicated to her.
 Lalla Aziza, saint celebrated by the Amazighs of the Seksawa of the High Atlas. 16th century woman who had played a role in resistance to the Merinids. It introduced Sufism into the region and marked the independence of the Seksawa.
 Lalla Rahma Youssef, saint of Massa, in the Sous region of Morocco.
 Lalla Manna (18..–1939) or Emna Ben Hammouda, known to be one of the righteous saints of Tunisia.

Tombs and mausoleums

 Tomb of Lalla Aziza, located in the country Seksawa, in the High Atlas, in Morocco.
 Mausoleum of Lalla Mennana, in Tunis, Tunisia.
 Mausoleum of Lalla Yemna, located at the top of Mount Gouraya in Bejaïa, in Kabylia, Algeria.
 Mausoleum of Lalla Manoubia, located in El Gorjani, in Tunis, Tunisia.

Others
 Treaty of Lalla Maghnia.
 Mosque of Lalla Saïda.
 Lalla Abla Mosque in Tangier, Morocco. 
 Museum of Lalla Hadria, museum in Djerba, Tunisia.

See also
 Lala (title)

References

External links

Arabic language
Arabic honorifics
Religious honorifics
Women's social titles
Religious titles
Noble titles
Women by social class
Berber culture
Moroccan monarchy
Tunisian monarchy